Cécile Rouleau (April 5, 1905 – January 3, 1999) was a sociologist and trade unionist in Quebec, Canada. She was the first woman to hold a management position in the government of Quebec.

Biography
She was born in Quebec City and received a diploma in social sciences from Laval University in 1943.

She founded the journal La Montée and served as its director.

In 1979, she was named an officer in the Compagnie des Cent-Associés francophones. She was named an officer in the National Order of Quebec in 1987.

Rouleau published more than 470 articles and other publications.

She died in Quebec City in 1999.

The Bibliothèque Cécile-Rouleau was named in her honour.

References 

1905 births
1999 deaths
Trade unionists from Quebec
Officers of the National Order of Quebec
Canadian sociologists
Canadian women sociologists
Quebec civil servants
Université Laval alumni
Canadian women trade unionists
People from Quebec City